Andres is a commune in the Pas-de-Calais department in northern France.

Geography
Andres is a farming village located 8 miles (13 km) southeast of Calais, at the junction of the D244 and D248 roads.

Population

Sights
 The church of St. John, dating from the eighteenth century.
 The tower of an old windmill.

See also
Communes of the Pas-de-Calais department

References

Communes of Pas-de-Calais
Pale of Calais